Thlibothrips is a genus of thrips in the family Phlaeothripidae.

Species
 Thlibothrips antennalis
 Thlibothrips atavus
 Thlibothrips isunoki
 Thlibothrips malloti
 Thlibothrips manipurensis
 Thlibothrips nigricauda
 Thlibothrips primitivus

References

Phlaeothripidae
Thrips
Thrips genera